The FinePix S5 Pro is a digital single lens reflex camera introduced by Fujifilm on 25 September 2006 and since discontinued. It replaces the previous FinePix S3 Pro and keeps the Nikon F mount compatibility, including DX size lenses. It is based on the Nikon D200 body, and benefits from its improvements: 11-point autofocus, i-TTL flash, a bigger  LCD and a lithium-ion battery. It has a Super CCD 23×15.5 mm image sensor of the same configuration as its predecessor, with 6.17 million low sensitivity pixels and 6.17 million high sensitivity pixels to give a high dynamic range, and a boost to 3200 ISO.

It introduces also a face detection feature for reviewing those details faster and an improved iteration of the S3 Pro's "live view" function to help focusing, and to take pictures without using the viewfinder. It is possible to use it in tethered operation, to connect a barcode reader and a wired ethernet or Wi-Fi link.

Compatibility with Nikon D200 battery systems 

While the Finepix S5 Pro shares the same body design as the Nikon D200, it is not fully compatible with the Nikon D200's EN-EL3e battery system. The Finepix S5 Pro will not even work when using the Nikon MB-D200 battery pack and vertical battery grip; you must use either the Fujifilm NP-150 lithium batteries or 6 AA cells. Fuji only approves LR6 (AA Alkaline), HR6 (AA Ni-MH) and ZR6 (AA Ni-Mn). Fuji does not approve the use of Ni-CD, lithium or manganese AA Batteries.

UV/IR version of camera 

On July 13, 2007, Fujifilm announced an ultraviolet and infrared  sensitive version of the Finepix S5 Pro, the FinePix IS Pro. The camera is marketed towards the law-enforcement, medical and scientific communities.

See also
FinePix S3 Pro
FinePix IS Pro

References

External links
 Finepix S5 Pro at Fujifilm Global
 Finepix S5 Pro Review at Digital Photography Review

S5